Christina Duhig is an American poet.

Life
Originally from Pittsburgh, Pennsylvania, she studied at Case Western Reserve University and received a  Master of Fine Arts from the  University of North Carolina, Greensboro.  She has taught at North Carolina A&T State University. and  John Jay College of Criminal Justice. She currently lives in Brooklyn and teaches at Bronx Community College and Fordham University.

Her poems have appeared in Best New Poets 2007, Washington Square, The Greensboro Review, Barrow Street, and Tuesday; An Art Project.

Works
"Post Trauma", Greensboro Review, Fall 2007
 The city skirts University of North Carolina at Greensboro (2007)

Anthologies

References

Year of birth missing (living people)
Living people
Case Western Reserve University alumni
North Carolina A&T State University faculty
University of North Carolina at Greensboro alumni
American women poets
Bronx Community College faculty
American women academics
21st-century American women